Borj-e Akram (also Romanized as Borj Akram; also known as Borj) is a village in Borj-e Akram Rural District, in the Central District of Fahraj County, Kerman Province, Iran. At the 2006 census, its population was 1,160, in 240 families.

References 

Populated places in Fahraj County